Straszewo may refer to the following places:
Straszewo, Greater Poland Voivodeship  (west-central Poland)
Straszewo, Konin County
Straszewo, Wągrowiec
Straszewo, Kuyavian-Pomeranian Voivodeship (north-central Poland)
Straszewo, Podlaskie Voivodeship (north-east Poland)
Straszewo, Pomeranian Voivodeship (north Poland)